Bosnia and Herzegovina, represented by the Olympic Committee of Bosnia and Herzegovina (BiH OK), sent a team to compete in the 2008 Summer Olympics in Beijing, China. The team consisted of 5 competitors.

Athletics

Men
Track & road events

Women
Track & road events

Judo 

Men

Shooting

Men

Swimming

Men

References 

Nations at the 2008 Summer Olympics
2008
Summer Olympics